Homeobox protein Hox-A13 is a protein that in humans is encoded by the HOXA13 gene.

Function 

In vertebrates, the genes encoding the class of transcription factors called homeobox genes are found in clusters named A, B, C, and D on four separate chromosomes. Expression of these proteins is spatially and temporally regulated during embryonic development. This gene is part of the A cluster on chromosome 7 and encodes a DNA-binding transcription factor which may regulate gene expression, morphogenesis, and differentiation.

Clinical significance 

Expansion of a polyalanine tract in the encoded protein can cause  hand-foot-genital syndrome, also known as hand-foot-uterus syndrome. Aberrant expression of HoxA13  gene products in the esophagus, provokes Barrett’s esophagus, a form of metaplasia that is a direct precursor to esophageal cancer.

See also 
 Homeobox

References

Further reading

External links 
 GeneReviews/NCBI/NIH/UW entry on Hand-Foot-Genital Syndrome
 

Transcription factors